Florida's 89th House District elects one member of the Florida House of Representatives. The district is represented by Mike Caruso (politician). This district is located on the southeast coast of Florida.

The district covers a portion of Palm Beach County.

As of the 2010 Census, the district's population is 155,172.

Representatives

References 

89
Palm Beach County, Florida